Julie Bøe Jacobsen (born 23 June 1998) is a Norwegian female handballer who plays for Team Esbjerg.

Achievements
Junior World Championship: 
Silver Medalist: 2018
Norwegian League:
Bronze Medalist: 2019/2020

Individual awards
 All-Star Centre Back of Eliteserien: 2019/2020

References
 

1998 births
Living people
Norwegian female handball players
21st-century Norwegian women